Charles Stuart Parker (1 June 1829 – 18 June 1910) was a British academic, writer and Liberal politician.

Life
Parker was the eldest son of Charles Stewart Parker (1800–1868), merchant, of Aigburth, Liverpool, and Fairlie, Ayrshire, and his wife, Anne Sandbach. When the British government emancipated the slaves in the 1830s, the elder Charles Stuart Parker was compensated for over 400 slaves he shared ownership of on 16 estates in British Guiana.

As a result of the wealth obtained by his father in sugar and slavery, the younger Charles Stuart Parker was educated at Eton and at University College, Oxford. After obtaining a first class degree he became a fellow of his college in 1854. From 1857 he gave private tuition to the future philosopher T.H. Green of Balliol College, helping Green to his First in Greats in 1859.  He was a public examiner at Oxford in 1859, 1860, 1863, and 1868. From 1864 to 1868 he was Private Secretary to Edward Cardwell, 1st Viscount Cardwell when he was Secretary of State for the Colonies. Cardwell married Parker's sister Annie.

At the 1868 general election, Parker was elected as the Member of Parliament (MP) for Perthshire. He was a member of the Royal Commission on Military Education from 1869 to 1870, and of the Scottish Endowed Schools Commission from 1872 to 1874, and was one of the Special Commissioners for Public Schools. Parker lost his Perthshire seat at the 1874 general election. He was returned the House of Commons as MP for Perth at a by-election in January 1878 at a by-election, and held the seat until 1892. He was chairman of referees on Private Bills in the 1885 parliament.

Parker collated and published the papers of Sir Robert Peel in 1899. He also published Life and Letters of Sir James Graham, Second Baronet of Netherby, P.C., G.C.B., 1792-1861  in 1907.

Parker lived at Fairlie House, which had been built by his grandfather, Charles Stewart Parker the elder (1771–1828). He died in London at the age of 81.

References

External links 
 
 

1829 births
1909 deaths
Alumni of University College, Oxford
Members of the Parliament of the United Kingdom for Scottish constituencies
Members of the Privy Council of the United Kingdom
People educated at Eton College
Scottish Liberal Party MPs
UK MPs 1868–1874
UK MPs 1874–1880
UK MPs 1885–1886
UK MPs 1886–1892